Louis Joseph Kenny Tussaud (1869–1938) was a great-grandson of Marie Tussaud, creator of the Madame Tussauds wax museums. He worked at Madame Tussauds museum as a wax figure sculptor but left when his brother John Theodore Tussaud became chief artist and manager of the museum after a limited company was formed in 1888 and sold in 1889. The main shareholder was Edwin Josiah Poyser.

Louis Tussaud created a waxwork museum in London, 207 Regent Street, which opened 24 December 1890. The Regent Street waxwork museum was destroyed in a fire on 20 June 1891. He moved to Blackpool in 1900. He first set up a waxworks in Blackpool in the basement of the Hippodrome Theatre, Church Street, opening it in July 1900. The following year, he moved the exhibition to the Brunswick Café, South Shore. In 1929 the Louis Tussaud's Waxworks opened on Central Promenade. It was closed in 2010 and re-opened as Madame Tussauds in 2011.

Louis Tussaud wax museums were later established in Atlantic City; Belle Vue, Greater Manchester; Brighton (1937–1979); Copenhagen (1974–2007); Great Yarmouth (1954–2013) and St. Petersburg, Florida. There was a Louis Tussaud shakespearian waxworks in Stratford-upon-Avon from 1971 to 1983.

Other Louis Tussaud's wax museums owned by Ripley Entertainment are in:
 Niagara Falls, Ontario, Canada
 San Antonio, Texas, USA
 Grand Prairie, Texas, USA
 Newport, Oregon, USA 
 Bangalore-Innovative Film City, India
 Pattaya, Thailand

Louis Tussaud's museums are not connected to his great-grandmother's Madame Tussauds wax museum nor to the Josephine Tussaud's (1900–1985) wax museum in Hot Springs, Arkansas.

Louis Tussauds, Blackpool, (which was temporarily owned by Leisure Parcs) was bought out by Blackpool Council. The attraction closed in November 2010 and passed to the management of the Merlin Entertainment Group.

The Potter's Wax Museum of St. Augustine and the wax museum of Niagara Falls have wax busts representing Louis Tussaud. The wax museum of Bangalore has a full-sized wax figure representing Louis Tussaud.

References

External links
 Louis Tussaud's Waxworks, Blackpool, England, United Kingdom
 Louis Tussaud's Waxworks, San Antonio, Texas
 Louis Tussaud's Palace of Wax, Grand Prairie, Texas
 Louis Tussaud's Waxworks, Niagara Falls, Canada
 Louis Tussaud's Waxworks, Bangalore, India
 Louis Tussaud's Waxworks, Pattaya, Thailand
 3 New Venues under Merlin Management

Living people
Wax museums
English people of French descent
English people of German descent
English sculptors
1869 births